Kevin Duckworth (born 27 March 1974) is a South African cricketer. He played in two first-class and seventeen List A matches for Eastern Province from 1999/00 to 2001/02.

See also
 List of Eastern Province representative cricketers

References

External links
 

1974 births
Living people
South African cricketers
Eastern Province cricketers
Sportspeople from Harare